Austin Jones was an American football coach.  He served as the head coach at the University of Hawaii from 1909 to 1911.

Head coaching record

References

Year of birth missing
Year of death missing
Hawaii Rainbow Warriors football coaches